Ocotlán (from the Nahuatl ocotl ("pine tree"), meaning "place of pines") is a city in the Mexican state of Tlaxcala, located in the centre of that state within the conurbation of the state capital, Tlaxcala de Xicohténcatl.

The , dedicated to the Virgin of Ocotlán, a 1541 Marian apparition, is a site of Roman Catholic pilgrimage.

In the 2005 INEGI census, Ocotlán reported a population of 22,082, making it the largest settlement in the municipality of Tlaxcala: more populous even than the state capital, which reported 15,777.

References

External links
Nuestra Señora de Ocotlán (México Desconocido)

Populated places in Tlaxcala